Macromedaeus is a genus of crabs in the family Xanthidae, containing the following species:

 Macromedaeus crassimanus (A. Milne-Edwards, 1867)
 Macromedaeus demani (Odhner, 1925)
 Macromedaeus distinguendus (De Haan, 1835)
 Macromedaeus nudipes (A. Milne-Edwards, 1867)
 Macromedaeus quinquedentatus (Krauss, 1843)
 Macromedaeus voeltzkowi (Lenz, 1905)

References

Xanthoidea